Weinzierl may refer to:

Weinzierl am Walde, a town in Austria
Weinzierl Castle, a castle in Austria
Weinzierl (surname)